Fort Rotterdam is a 17th-century fort in Makassar on the island of Sulawesi in Indonesia. It is a Dutch fort built on top of an existing fort of the Gowa Kingdom. The first fort on the site was constructed by the a local sultan in around 1634, to counter Dutch encroachments. The site was ceded to the Dutch under the Treaty of Bongaya, and they completely rebuilt it between 1673 and 1679. It had six bastions and was surrounded by a seven meter high rampart and a two meter deep moat.

The fort was the Dutch regional military and governmental headquarters until the 1930s. It was extensively restored
in the 1970s and is now a cultural and educational centre, a venue for music and dance events, and a tourist destination.

History
Fort Rotterdam was built on the location of an earlier Makassarese fort, called Ujung Pandang.  It seems more likely that the fort was built in 1634, as part of a fortification programme that the Makassar rulers undertook in response to a war with the Dutch East India Company (VOC) which broke out in that year. The original fort, Jum Pandan (allegedly named after the pandanus trees growing in the vicinity), gave its name to the city Ujung Pandang, another name for the city of Makassar.

In 1667 Fort Ujung Pandang was ceded to the Dutch as part of the Treaty of Bongaya, after the defeat of the Sultanate of Gowa in the Makassar War. In subsequent years it was entirely rebuilt on the initiative of Dutch admiral Cornelis Speelman, to become the center of Dutch colonial power in Sulawesi. It was renamed Fort Rotterdam after Speelman's place of birth. In the years 1673–1679 it got its five bastions and the 'turtle' shape it still has to this day. This shape gave the fort the nickname "Benteng Penyu" ("sea-turtle fort").
 The stone for the construction of the fort was taken from the karst mountains in Maros, the limestone from Selayar and the timber from Tanete and Bantaeng. Following the Java War of 1825–1830, Javanese prince, and now national hero, Diponegoro was imprisoned in the fort following his exile to Makassar in 1830 until his death in 1855. It was also used as a Japanese prisoner of war camp in World War II.

Fort Rotterdam remained the regional Dutch military and governmental headquarters until the 1930s. After 1937, the fort was no longer used as a defense. During the brief Japanese occupation it was used for conducting scientific research in the field of linguistics and agriculture, after which it fell into disrepair. In the 1970s, the fort was extensively restored.

Description

Fort Rotterdam lies in the centre of Makassar. It is rectangular in shape, surrounded by a seven meter wall. It was originally equipped with six bulwarks, five of which are still visible: Bastion Bonie (after Bone state) to the west; Bastion Boeton (after Buton Island) to the northwest; Bastion Batjang (after the Bacan Islands) to the southwest; Bastion Mandassar to the northeast; and Bastion Amboina (after Ambon) to the southeast. The sixth bulwark, Bastion Ravelin, is no longer visible. Some of the bastions still contain cannons. It is possible to walk over most of the ramparts. A two meter deep moat system used to surround the perimeter of the fort, however only the southwest portion of the moat can still be seen.

Current status
Inside the fort are thirteen buildings, eleven of them are 17th-century original buildings of the fort; most are still good in condition. At the centre of the fort is a church building. Several buildings along the north and south curtain walls still exist. The buildings along the northern curtain wall were some of the oldest buildings, dating from 1686, such as the residence of the governor, residence of the senior merchant, of the captain, the predikant, and the secretary, with several storage buildings for weapons. The governor's residence at the north-westernmost corner is nicknamed as "the Speelman's House", however Speelman himself never actually lived in this house. The house was used by the governor of Celebes until the mid 19th-century when he moved to a more comfortable villa in Jalan Ahmad Yani. The Speelman's House now houses part of La Galigo museum. La Galigo museum has some prehistoric megaliths from Watampone, as well as ancient weapons, coins, shells, utensils, sketches and stamps.

The buildings on the south curtain, originally used for storage, house a museum displaying local skills in silk weaving, agriculture and boatbuilding; and scale models of indigenous boats. The barracks on the eastern wall now house a small library, featuring old Dutch books that mostly belonged to Reverend Mates, a 19th-century missionary. There are also ships' logs of VOC captains and ancient lontar manuscripts. The department of archaeology is housed in the former building of the head of  administration for the VOC; the ground floor of the building, located in the southeast corner of the fort, was formerly a prison. The other two buildings inside Fort Rotterdam were built by the Japanese during the Japanese occupation period. The southwestern Bastion (Bastion Bacan) contains a prison where Prince Diponegoro was imprisoned at the end of his life.

The fort is now used to hold various events. There is a conservatory for music and dance, an archive of the city, and a historic and archaeological institute.

See also

 Colonial architecture in Indonesia

References

Works cited

 
 
 
 
 
 
 

Rotterdam
Buildings and structures in Makassar
Buildings and structures in South Sulawesi
South Sulawesi
South Sulawesi
Installations of the Royal Netherlands East Indies Army
Tourist attractions in South Sulawesi
Buildings and structures associated with the Dutch East India Company